The president of the First Chamber of the Landtag of Alsace-Lorraine was the presiding officer of the first chamber of that legislature

Office-holders 
Otto Back 1911–1917
Johannes Hoeffel 1917–1918

See also
List of presidents of the Second Chamber of the Landtag of Alsace-Lorraine

Alsace
Political history of Germany